Coptic church may refer to:

The Coptic Orthodox Church, a church in the Oriental Orthodox communion
The Coptic Catholic Church, one of the Eastern Catholic Churches in communion with the Holy See
The Ethiopian Orthodox Tewahedo Church, an Oriental Orthodox Christian church in Sub-Saharan Africa